Joseph Dayo Oshadogan (born 27 June 1976) is an Italian former professional footballer who played as a defender.

Club career
Oshadogan was born in 1976 in Genoa to a Nigerian father and an Italian mother. He grew up in Pisa, where he spent some time as part of the local team's youth system.

In 1994, he moved to Foggia, where he made his professional debut in the Serie B on 26 August 1995. He played at the club for four seasons, his longest stint at one club in his career.

In 1999, he signed for AS Roma, but left the Giallorossi soon later to join Reggina, where he spent two seasons.

After a two-year spell at Cosenza, in 2003 he joined French side AS Monaco, where he played only four domestic league matches in two seasons.

He then returned to Italy, joining Ternana, which he left following disagreements with the club management.

In May 2007 he joined Widzew Łódź, becoming the team captain, but left the club early in 2008,  refusing to return to Poland after having been fined by club management.

Oshadogan ended his career back in Italy at Virtus Lanciano where he stayed for two seasons, from 2008 to 2010.

International career
Oshadogan was also capped three times for the Italian under-21 national team, making him the first coloured player to represent Italy, making his debut for the Azzurrini on 3 October 1996, a 3–0 away win to Moldova.

References

External links
 Player profile at carrierecalciatori.it
 Player profile at FootballPlus.com
 

1976 births
Living people
Footballers from Genoa
Association football defenders
Italian footballers
Italian expatriate footballers
Italian people of Nigerian descent
Italian sportspeople of African descent
Serie B players
Ligue 1 players
Widzew Łódź players
Ternana Calcio players
AS Monaco FC players
Cosenza Calcio 1914 players
Ekstraklasa players
Reggina 1914 players
Calcio Foggia 1920 players
S.S. Virtus Lanciano 1924 players
Expatriate footballers in Poland
Expatriate footballers in Monaco
Italian expatriate sportspeople in Poland
Italian expatriate sportspeople in Monaco